Madeleine Zoe Damerment (11 November 1917 – 13 September 1944) was a French spy in World War II who served in the French Resistance and Britain's Special Operations Executive. Damerment was to be a courier for SOE's Bricklayer circuit in France during World War II but was arrested upon arrival by the Gestapo, who knew she was coming. She was subsequently executed at the Dachau concentration camp.

Early life 
Damerment was born in Lille, France, the second daughter of the city's postmaster. Her father got her a job as a clerk in the Post Office.

Wartime service

Escape line 
Following the occupation of France by the Germans in World War II, Damerment's family became actively involved with the French resistance. Damerment worked as an assistant to Michael Trotobas (British SOE agent) on the Pat O'Leary escape line set up by Albert Guérisse, where she helped downed British airmen and others to escape France until 1942, when one of her fellow resistance workers, Harold Cole, betrayed the group and she fled to England.

Special Operations Executive 
In England, Damerment volunteered to work with the Special Operations Executive and was allocated the cover name Martine Dussautoy and commissioned as an ensign in the FANY. Sent to Scotland for paramilitary training, Captain Dixon-Robertson, her signals instructor at Inverie (STS 24), determined that, only being considered fair for sending and receiving messages, she was unsuitable for work as a wireless operator , though Captain Smith reported that for physical training Damerment was a "keen and hard worker with good stamina." Damerment had a good grasp of the principles of close combat, worked well and was aggressive. For rope work, she was reported to have fair muscular strength and good co-ordination but required more practice. She worked well and showed keenness in fieldcraft although she found the theoretical side difficult.

For weapons training, Damerment was reported to have improved and was "now a fair shot with pistol and carbine, but is lacking in aggressiveness." She was very good at explosives and demolitions, both in theoretical and practical work, as she was reportedly "extremely keen" and made up "splendid charges", and was very good at writing route reports, being "accurate and painstaking". For schemes and tactics, Damerment was considered to have been a "very hard-working member of a band on all schemes and has a good knowledge of tactics as well as a fund of common sense." She was not very interested in boat work but "worked well and acquired a fair knowledge for elementary small boat handling and of knots."

Captain Parson, the Commandant, reported the following:

After celebrating Christmas (1943) and New Year in England, Damerment was sent to Beaulieu for a clandestine warfare course. Major Wedgewood, an instructor at the House on the Shore (STS 33), reported the following in the beginning of February.

Assigned the role of courier for the Bricklayer circuit (network), Damerment and agents France Antelme (organiser) and Lionel Lee (wireless operator) were parachuted from a RAF special duties 161 Squadron Halifax into a field near the city of Chartres in France on the night of 29 February 1944. However, the Gestapo were waiting after as a result of having captured SOE wireless operators and transmitted false messages with their radios. Damerment was transported to Gestapo headquarters on the Avenue Foch in Paris, where she was interrogated. On 12 May 1944, Damerment was sent with several other captured female SOE agents to Karlsruhe Prison, the civilian prison for women, where they were held for four months.

Execution 
On 12 September, Damerment was abruptly transferred to Dachau concentration camp with fellow agents Yolande Beekman, Noor Inayat Khan and Eliane Plewman, and at dawn on the following morning, 13 September, the four women were executed by Wilhelm Ruppert.

A Gestapo man named Max Wassmer was in charge of prisoner transports at Karlsruhe and accompanied the women to Dachau. Another Gestapo man named Christian Ott gave a statement to American investigators after the war as to the fate of Damerment and her three companions. Ott was stationed at Karlsruhe and volunteered to accompany the four women to Dachau as he wanted to visit his family in Stuttgart on the return journey. Though not present at the execution, Ott told investigators what Wassmer had told him.

This cannot be considered a reliable account as Ott told the investigator he had asked Wassmer the following question after being told what had happed to the women: "But tell me, what really happened", to which Wassmer replied: "So you want to know how it really happened?"

Honours and awards 

Following the war, Damerment's contribution was recognised by her government with the posthumous awarding of the Legion of Honor, Croix de Guerre, the Médaille de la Résistance, and by the British King's Commendation for Brave Conduct. She is recorded on the FANY memorial at St Paul's Church, Knightsbridge, London and also in column 3 of panel 26 of the Brookwood Memorial as one of 3,500 "to whom war denied a known and honoured grave".

Damerment is also listed on the "Roll of Honor" on the Valençay SOE Memorial in the town of Valençay, in the Indre Département of France. There is also a plaque on the south wall of the crematorium at the former Dachau concentration camp, where the four SOE agents are remembered.

Related cultural works 
 Carve Her Name with Pride (1958)
Movie based on the book by R.J. Minney about Violette Szabo, starring Paul Scofield and Virginia McKenna.
 Churchill's Spy School (2010)
Documentary about the SOE "finishing school" on the Beaulieu estate in Hampshire.
 Les Femmes de l'Ombre (aka Female Agents) (2008)
French film about five SOE female agents and their contribution towards the D-Day invasions.
 Nancy Wake Codename: The White Mouse (1987)
Docudrama about Nancy Wake's work for SOE, partly narrated by Wake (Wake was disappointed that the film was changed from an 8-hour resistance story to a 4-hour love story).
 Now It Can Be Told (aka School for Danger) (1946)
Filming began in 1944 and starred real-life SOE agents Captain Harry Rée and Jacqueline Nearne codenamed "Felix" and "Cat", respectively. The film tells the story of the training of agents for SOE and their operations in France. The training sequences were filmed using the SOE equipment at the training schools at Traigh and Garramor (South Morar) and at Ringway.
 Odette (1950)
Movie based on the book by Jerrard Tickell about Odette Sansom, starring Anna Neagle and Trevor Howard. The film includes an interview with Maurice Buckmaster, head of SOE's F-Section.
 Robert and the Shadows (2004)
French documentary on France Télévisions. Did General De Gaulle tell the whole truth about the French resistance? This is the purpose of this documentary. Jean Marie Barrere, the French director, uses the story of his own grandfather (Robert) to tell the French what SOE did at that time. Robert was a French teacher based in the southwest of France, who worked with SOE agent George Reginald Starr (codenamed "Hilaire", in charge of the "Wheelwright" circuit).
 Wish Me Luck (1987)
Television series that was broadcast between 1987 and 1990 featuring the exploits of the women and, less frequently, the men of SOE, which was renamed the 'Outfit'.

References

Citations

Bibliography

Further reading 

  Overview of the French Resistance.
  Focus on the four female SOE agents (Borrel, Leigh, Olschanezky and Rowden) executed in the Natzweiler-Struthof concentration camp.
  A once classified report compiled in 1946 by a former member of SOE's F Section, Major Robert Bourne-Patterson, who was a planning officer.
  Buckmaster was the head of SOE's F Section, who infamously ignored security checks by captured SOE wireless operators that indicated their capture, resulting in agents being captured and executed.
  Comprehensive coverage of the French Resistance.
 
  Overview of SOE (Foot won the Croix de Guerre as a SAS operative in Brittany, later becoming Professor of Modern History at Manchester University and an official historian of the SOE).
  Detailed look at SOE casualties and selected stories that are representative of the experience of SOE personnel.
  The second and most recent biography of Rowden.
  A thorough overview of SOE.
  The first biography of Rowden.
  Overview of the scores of female SOE agents sent into occupied Europe during WW2 including Borrel.
  Comprehensive coverage of the German occupation of France.
  Look at the lives of women in Paris during WW2.
  Overview of Atkins' activity at SOE (served as Buckmaster's intelligence officer in the F Section).
  Written by the son of Major Francis Suttill, the Prosper network chief executed by the Nazis in 1945.
  Documents the activities of female SOE agents in France including Borrel.
  Documents the activities of female OSS and SOE agents in France including Borrel.
  Documents RAF small aircraft landings in France during WW2 (author was one of the pilots).
  Overview of SOE activities.

External links 

1917 births
1944 deaths
People from Lille
Executed spies
Female wartime spies
French Resistance members
Female resistance members of World War II
Spies who died in Nazi concentration camps
French people who died in Dachau concentration camp
Recipients of the Croix de Guerre 1939–1945 (France)
Recipients of the Legion of Honour
Recipients of the Resistance Medal
Recipients of the Queen's Commendation for Brave Conduct
Special Operations Executive personnel killed in World War II
People executed by Nazi Germany by firearm
French people executed in Nazi concentration camps
Executed people from Nord-Pas-de-Calais
Female recipients of the Croix de Guerre (France)
French Special Operations Executive personnel
French women in World War II
20th-century French women
First Aid Nursing Yeomanry people